Michael Ugwuja Eneja (January 1919 – November 14, 2008) was a Nigerian prelate of the Roman Catholic Church. At the time of his death, he was one of the oldest Nigerian Catholic bishops.

Eneja was born in Ibagwa Ani, Nigeria and was ordained a priest on July 29, 1951, for the Archdiocese of Onitsha and later incardinated to the newly created Diocese of Enugu. He was appointed bishop of the Diocese of Enugu on November 10, 1977, and received his episcopal consecration on February 28, 1978. He remained bishop of the Diocese of Enugu until his retirement on November 8, 1996. He died on November 14, 2008.

In Nsukka there is an annual memorial lecture named after Eneja.

References
Catholic hierarchy entry

20th-century Roman Catholic bishops in Nigeria
Roman Catholic bishops of Enugu
1919 births
2008 deaths